Diana Maynard is a British computer scientist and computational linguist who works as a senior research fellow in the Natural Language Processing Group of the Department of Computer Science at the University of Sheffield.

Education and career
Maynard is originally from Chertsey. She was educated in Manchester, earning a bachelor's degree in 1995 at the University of Manchester Institute of Science and Technology, a master's degree from the University of Manchester in 1996, and a Ph.D. from Manchester Metropolitan University in 2000, completed despite becoming nearly blind from complications of childhood diabetes during her graduate studies.

Research
Maynard has been a researcher associated with the General Architecture for Text Engineering (GATE) project at Sheffield since 2000. Her research with the project includes the development of the Java Annotation Patterns Engine (JAPE) for using regular expressions to process annotations, as well as research on information extraction and sentiment analysis.

She is also associated with the Centre for Freedom of the Media, a research centre based at Sheffield, with whom she has worked on tools for monitoring attacks on journalists.

Books
Maynard is a coauthor of the books Text Processing with GATE (University of Sheffield, 2011) and Natural Language Processing for the Semantic Web (Morgan & Claypool, 2017).

References

External links
Home page at Sheffield
Personal blog

Year of birth missing (living people)
Living people
People from Chertsey
British computer scientists
Women computer scientists
Computational linguistics researchers
Alumni of the University of Manchester
Alumni of Manchester Metropolitan University